Medojevići is a Serbo-Croatian toponym, derived from the surname "Medojević". It may refer to:

Medojevići, Ilijaš, Bosnia and Herzegovina
Medojevići, Sokolac, Bosnia and Herzegovina

See also
Medoševići